Trygve Berge (born 13 April 1932) is a Norwegian alpine skier. He was born in Voss. He participated at the 1956 Winter Olympics in  Cortina d'Ampezzo, where he competed in downhill.

He became Norwegian champion in downhill in 1956.

References

1932 births
Living people
People from Voss
Norwegian male alpine skiers
Olympic alpine skiers of Norway
Alpine skiers at the 1956 Winter Olympics
Sportspeople from Vestland